Alliance, Texas is a planned community located within Denton County and Tarrant County, Texas, United States. It includes parts of the cities of Haslet, Fort Worth, Westlake, Northlake, Denton, and Roanoke. It is currently owned by Hillwood, a Henry Ross Perot, Jr. company.

Businesses
AllianceTexas is home to the branches of more than 500 companies of which 69 are Fortune 500 corporations as of Dec. 2018. The total private investment as of December 2018 is $9,036,738,025, with the total public investment totaling $775,380,929 as of December 2018. Alliance companies employ 61,602 people of various positions.

Residential
AllianceTexas contains 7 major developments: Heritage, Saratoga, Harvest, Chisholm Ridge, Creekwood, Park Glen, and Pecan Square. There are over 10,000 single-family homes located within these 6 communities plus 2,100 apartments units and 200 hotel rooms, all of which are located near the Alliance Town Center, Cabela's and the Texas Motor Speedway.

Transportation
AllianceTexas is served by a Global Logistics Hub, including the BNSF Railway's Alliance Intermodal Rail Hub and Fort Worth Alliance Airport for rail and air cargo. Interstate 35W, Alliance Gateway Freeway, U.S. Route 377, Texas Highway 114, Texas Highway 170, and Texas Farm to Market road 156 all run through the community.

References

External links
CommunitiesMain Page

Unincorporated communities in Denton County, Texas
Unincorporated communities in Tarrant County, Texas
Unincorporated communities in Texas